Four ships of the United States Navy have been named USS Indiana in honor of the 19th state.

, was a battleship commissioned in 1895 that saw action in the Spanish–American War
, was a battleship under construction but canceled by the Washington Naval Treaty in 1924
, was a battleship commissioned in 1942 that saw action during World War II
, is a  launched on 9 June 2017

United States Navy ship names